Leader-Rosansky House is a Queen Anne and Classical Revival house in Vidalia, Georgia that was built in 1903. It was listed on the National Register of Historic Places in 1995.

Description and history 
It is a one-and-one-half-story, frame house. It has weatherboard siding and a hipped pressed metal roof. It is believed to have been designed by regional architect-builder Ivey P. Crutchfield (1878-1952), based on its Georgian central hallway plan, its non-rectangular rooms, and elaborate detailing similar to his known works.

Almost directly across the street is the Peterson-Wilbanks House and nearby is the Crawford W. Brazell House, both designed by Ivey P. Crutchfield and listed on the NRHP.

References

Houses on the National Register of Historic Places in Georgia (U.S. state)
Queen Anne architecture in Georgia (U.S. state)
Neoclassical architecture in Georgia (U.S. state)
Houses in Toombs County, Georgia
Houses completed in 1903
National Register of Historic Places in Toombs County, Georgia